Ranoidea maculosa, the Daly Waters frog, is a species of frog in the subfamily Pelodryadinae.
It is endemic to Australia. Its natural habitats are subtropical or tropical dry lowland grassland and intermittent freshwater marshes.

References

Ranoidea (genus)
Amphibians of Queensland
Amphibians of the Northern Territory
Taxonomy articles created by Polbot
Amphibians described in 1977
Frogs of Australia
Taxobox binomials not recognized by IUCN